Strong Enough may refer to:

Songs
"Strong Enough" (Sheryl Crow song), 1994
"Strong Enough" (Cher song), 1998
"Strong Enough" (Stacie Orrico song), 2003
"Strong Enough" (50 Cent song), 2009
"Strong Enough" (Matthew West song), 2011
"Strong Enough", a 1996 song by Boyzone from A Different Beat

Albums
Strong Enough (BlackHawk album), 1995
Strong Enough (Travis Tritt album), 2002